The Kia Telluride is a mid-size crossover SUV with three-row seating manufactured and marketed by Kia since 2019. Positioned above the smaller Sorento, the Telluride was previewed as a concept car in 2016, with the production model debuting in the spring of 2019 as a 2020 model. It shares components and specifications with its sister model, the Hyundai Palisade, including its engine, transmission, and wheelbase. Named after the town of Telluride, Colorado, the Telluride is the largest vehicle Kia has manufactured in the United States.

In 2020, the Telluride was named the 2020 World Car of the Year as well as Motor Trend's SUV of the year.

Overview

The production version of the Telluride was launched at the 2019 North American International Auto Show in January. Previously, the Telluride was displayed as a customized version inspired by fashion designer Brandon Maxwell's Texas-inspired collection, at New York Fashion Week in September 2018. The overall design is similar to the 2016 concept except for the front end which was completely redesigned.

The Telluride is the first Kia designed specifically for the US market, with the design work handled at the Kia Design Center in Irvine, California.

The Telluride features four drive modes – Smart, Eco, Sport and Comfort. Snow and AWD Lock modes are also available for specific driving conditions, and the on-demand electro-hydraulic AWD system with multi-plate clutch plate constantly redistributes power to both axles. In Eco and Smart modes, power is completely routed to the front wheels, whereas Sport mode splits the power down to 65 percent front, 35 percent rear.

The Telluride is not marketed in South Korea as it is only produced in the United States, whereas its Hyundai counterpart, the Korean-built Palisade is marketed there instead. Exports from the West Point, Georgia plant to the Middle East started in February 2019. Kia limited exports of the Telluride to around 3,000 units annually.

Trim levels
In U.S. and Canada, the Telluride is offered in four trim levels: LX, S, EX, and SX. The latter is offered with an optional "SX Prestige Package," which include several premium features. Since 2021, Kia has offered a "Premium Package" on the EX trim. A 3-seat bench is standard for the second row while captain's chairs can be added, dropping the seating capacity from eight to seven.

All Tellurides are equipped with various features that are otherwise optional in some of its competitors, such as "Sofino" (leatherette)-trimmed or leather-trimmed seating surfaces. Available equipment includes a 10.25-inch touchscreen infotainment system, rear view monitor, 630-watt 10-speaker Harman Kardon audio system, wireless smartphone charging tray, and head-up display with turn-by-turn navigation, along with heated and ventilated first and second row bucket seats. The Telluride is also equipped with Driver Talk for some trim levels, an in-car intercom system that allows the driver to communicate separately with passengers in the second or third row.

2023 refresh 
The refreshed 2023 Telluride was unveiled at the New York International Auto Show on April 13, 2022. New convenience technology such as a 12.3-inch instrument panel and an available smart power liftgate with auto-close functionality were added. On the exterior, the grille, headlights, and front bumper were redesigned. More rugged-looking X-Line and X-Pro trims became available since the 2023 model year.

Concept version

The concept version was first introduced at the 2016 North American International Auto Show. Fuel consumption is claimed to be .

The exterior was finished in dark pyrite paint and featured a squared off body riding on 22-inch rims, as well as an enlarged tiger nose grille and multiple LED headlamps, consistent with Kia's current design language (as of 2016). The car's suicide doors swung open 90 degrees in opposite directions, revealing a pillarless design. Some of the interior components were 3D printed, marking Kia's first usage of 3D printing technology. It was designed by Tom Kearns from Kia Design Center America.

Sales

References

External links 

Telluride
Telluride
Cars introduced in 2019
Mid-size sport utility vehicles
Crossover sport utility vehicles